Rebels on the Run is the seventh studio album by American country music duo Montgomery Gentry. It was released on October 18, 2011 via Average Joes Entertainment. Inside one copy of the album was a golden ticket for a custom-made Demented Cycles motorcycle.

"So Called Life" was previously recorded and released by its songwriter, Sean Patrick McGraw, and was also recorded by Jaydee Bixby on his 2008 album Cowboys and Cadillacs.

Track listing

Personnel
 Perry Coleman - background vocals
 Charlie Daniels - vocals on "I Like Those People"
 Troy Gentry - lead vocals, background vocals
 Shalacy Griffin - background vocals
 Angela Hacker - background vocals
 Tony Harrell - Hammond B-3 organ, piano, Wurlitzer
 Mike Johnson - pedal steel guitar, lap steel guitar
 Rob McNelley - electric guitar
 Eddie Montgomery - lead vocals, background vocals
 Greg Morrow - drums, percussion
 Jason Mowery - fiddle
 Randy Owen - vocals on "I Like Those People"
 Rich Redmond - percussion
 Adam Shoenfeld - electric guitar, slide guitar
 Jimmie Lee Sloas - bass guitar
 Ilya Toshinsky - banjo, bouzouki, 12-string guitar, acoustic guitar, hi-string guitar

Chart performance
The album has sold 85,000 copies in the United States as of May 2015.

Album

Singles

References

2011 albums
Montgomery Gentry albums
Average Joes Entertainment albums
Albums produced by Michael Knox (record producer)